Gemmi Pass is a high mountain pass across the Bernese Alps connecting Leukerbad (on the south) in the canton of Valais with Kandersteg (on the north) in the canton of Bern. The main trail reaches .

The pass lies between the Daubenhorn in the west and the Rinderhorn in the east.

The pass is at the west end of the Aar Massif and at the east end of the Wildstrubel Massif. Near the pass is the Daubensee, which has no outlet above ground. The Gemmi Fault passes close to the pass.

The pass is mentioned in the Sherlock Holmes story The Final Problem.  Sherlock Holmes and Dr. Watson cross the pass on their way to Meiringen, where Sherlock Holmes has his famous meeting with Professor Moriarty at the Reichenbach Falls.

The pass is described by Guy de Maupassant in his short-story L'Auberge. The American writer Mark Twain also visited the pass in August 1878, and described it in a letter to his wife.

Although the pass cannot be traversed by road, it is still directly accessible by cablecar from Leukerbad. Alternatively, the pass can be reached by a two-hour dramatic hike on foot. From Kandersteg a cable car gives access to the Sunnbüel area (1,934 m), 10 km north of the pass, allowing hikers to cross the pass on a wide and easy trail.

The trail over the Gemmi Pass is very popular with hikers both in summer and in winter.

The pass itself is also used as a vantage point, because of the view of some major peaks in the Pennine Alps, such as the Dom, Matterhorn, Weisshorn and Dent Blanche.

See also
 List of mountain passes in Switzerland

References

External links
 

Mountain passes of the Alps
Mountain passes of Switzerland
Mountain passes of Valais